Panchkula (PKL_Haryanvi) is a planned city and district headquarter in the Panchkula district, part of the Ambala division in Haryana, India. The origin of the name Panchkula came from the place where five irrigation canals meet. At present, it forms a part of an adjoining area to the Chandigarh, Mohali and Zirakpur. It is a part of the Chandigarh capital region or Greater Chandigarh. The Chandigarh-Mohali-Panchkula metropolitan region collectively forms a Chandigarh Tricity, with a combined population of over two million.

The city hosts the Chandimandir Cantonment, the headquarters of the Western Command of the Indian Army. It is a planned city like Chandigarh, with a sector system.

Etymology
The word is derived from the local word panch (five) and kula (canals) "The city of 5 canals", possibly referring to five irrigation canals that distribute water from the Ghaggar River and these kuls pass through the Chandimandir Cantonment area to Mata Mansa Devi Mandir area. Kuls or canals were made along the contours of the hillocks in a way that they collect the water upstream and convey it downstream at the contour height higher than the actual level of the Ghaggar river at the same spot. One of the canals is called the Singh Nalla which was being beautified in 2021 by building a walking track and by planting the plants and flowers.

History
The city is named after Panchkula village, which is situated on the Ambala Kalka highway, near the junction with the Chandigarh road. The city was planned and developed by the state of Haryana in the 1970s. Panchkula was supposed to be the capital.

Ramgarh Fort and Mata Mansa Devi Temple
 
The fort was built by the rulers of Kahlur State, the headquarters of which was Bilaspur in Himachal Pradesh. The King of Bilaspur built the Ramgarh Fort 360 years ago. In 1687, its rulers offered Guru Gobind Singh a horse, a sword and Rs 500000 when he was relocating his troops from Paonta Sahib to Anandpur Sahib after the Battle of Bhangani. In the 1750s, it eventually fell to the status of a fief under the Sirmur State, but became independent again in 1804. It is currently occupied by the progeny of Kalee Chand, younger son of King of Bilaspur Sangar Chand (r. 1197–1220), and run as a heritage hotel.

Mata Mansa Devi Mandir is a Hindu temple dedicated to Goddess Mansa Devi, a form of Shakti, in the Panchkula district of Haryana state in India. It is one of the prominent Shakti Pitha temples of North India involving seven Shakti goddesses, namely Mata Mansa Devi, Naina Devi, Jawalamukhi, Chintpurni, Brajeshwari, Chamunda Devi and Jayanti Devi. Thousands of devotees visit the shrine from various parts of the country, and especially during the Navratra mela, this number rises to lakhs every day for the nine auspicious days.

Geography and climate

Panchkula district has a sub-tropical continental monsoon climate with hot summers, cool winters and monsoon rainfall. It has great variation in temperature. Sometimes winter frost occurs during December and January. The district also receives winter rains from the western disturbance. The rainfall is mostly received in the monsoon. Morni hills constitute the highest point of the district as well as of Haryana. The Ghaggar is the only perennial river, which is very shallow outside of the monsoons. The mountains and hills of Kasauli are clearly visible from Panchkula.

Generally, the slope of the district is from northeast to southwest and in this direction, most of the rivers/streams rain-fed torrents flow down and spread much gravel and pebbles in their beds. Only the Sirsa river, in Kalka Tehsil flows towards the northwest. The soils in the district are mainly light loam.

The underground water in the district is generally fresh and suitable for domestic and irrigation purposes. The underground water level is generally high in the southern parts and low in the north and northeast which is hilly tract. The district lies in the Himalayas boundary fault zones and earthquakes of moderate to high intensity have occurred in the past.

Average temperature
Spring: It lasts from February-end to early-April. Temperatures vary from (max)  and (min) .
Summer: The temperature in summer (from mid-April to June-end) may rise even above .
Monsoon: During monsoon season (from early-July to mid-September), Panchkula receives moderate to heavy rainfall and sometimes heavy to very heavy rainfall (generally during the month of August or September). Usually, the rain-bearing monsoon winds blow from southwest/southeast. The city mostly receives heavy rain from the south (which is usually a persistent rain) but it generally receives most of its rain during monsoon either from the northwest or the northeast.
Winter: Winters (November-end to February-end) are mild but it can sometimes get quite chilly in Panchkula. Average temperatures in the winter remain at (max) and (min) . Rain usually comes from the west during winters and it is usually a persistent rain for 2–3  days, sometimes with hail-storms.

Demographics

According to the 2011 Census of India, the people of the city are overwhelmingly Hindu, with Sikh and Muslim micro minorities. According to the surveys conducted, the majority of the people in Panchkula speak Hindi and Haryanvi as their first language, with English, Punjabi as the second most spoken language.

In 2011, Panchkula had 48,772 households in the city, with a population of 211,355, of which male and female were 111,731 and 99,624 respectively.

Government and politics 
The city is a part of the Ambala Lok Sabha constituency represented by BJP's Rattan Lal Kataria, and the Panchkula state assembly constituency, represented by BJP's Gian Chand Gupta since 2019.

City administration 

Panchkula municipality is governed under the Haryana Municipal Act, 1973. According to the 2011 Census, Panchkula is governed by a municipal council, but it has since upgraded to the status of a municipal corporation. The population of the municipality, as per Census 2011, is 210,175.

Since 2017, Rajesh Jogpal (HCS) headed the corporation as its municipal commissioner.  In December 2019, he was transferred and replaced by IAS Sumedha Kataria. The first woman Mayor of Panchkula was Upinder Kaur Ahluwalia, who served the term from 2013 to 2018. In 2018, the state decided to hold direct elections for the post, and as of now, the mayor of Panchkula is Kulbhushan Goyal of BJP. In a closely contested mayoral election in Panchkula, Bharatiya Janata Party’s Kulbhushan Goyal trumped the Congress’ Upinder Kaur Ahluwalia by 2,057 votes.

BJP also secured a majority in the 20-member municipal corporation House by winning 11 seats along with its alliance partner Jannayak Janata Party. Congress won seven seats, and two went to Independent candidates.

In July 2020, the Panchkula Municipal Corporation was bifurcated, with Kalka and Pinjore separating from the corporation and getting their own municipal council status.

Civic utilities 
Water supply and sewerage in Panchkula is maintained by Haryana Urban Development Authority (HUDA), the Public Health and Engineering Department (PHED) of the state, as well as the municipal corporation at the local level. As of 2008, 80 MLD of water is supplied to Panchkula city, and it is treated by chlorination.

As per the National Institute of Urban Affairs (NIUA) report, 100% door to door collection has been ensured in all wards through waste pickers. Jhariwala village has a sanitary landfill for the waste, where unsegregated waste is dumped. The city also has a community composting facility, material recovery facility and biogas plant. As of 2008, the city generated 64 MLD of sewage and had three sewage treatment plants (STPs) that were functional with a capacity of 18, 39 and 15 MLD respectively.

Panchkula city has an interim master plan that has been published by the Town and Country Planning department of Haryana state.

Economy

Employment 
Panchkula IT Park (also known as Haryana State Industrial and Infrastructural Development Corporation Technology Park) is the state of art infrastructure to facilitate information technology in the city. It spreads over 74 acres developed by HSIIDC situated in sector 22 on the foothills of Shivalik Hills or outer Himalayas and on the banks of the Ghaggar River. It is well connected to Delhi, Haryana, Punjab and Himachal Pradesh.

Tourism 
There are various tourist attractions in and around Panchkula including:

Mata Mansa Devi Mandir is one of the most prominent temples in North India and is dedicated to Goddess Mansa Devi, a form of Shakti.
Bhima Devi Temple Site Museum, nicknamed Khajuraho of North India for its erotic sculptures, comprises the restored ruins of an ancient Hindu temple dating from between 8th and 11th century AD.
Nada Sahib is a Sikh Gurudwara in the Panchkula district of the Indian state of Haryana. Situated on the banks of the Ghaggar-Hakra River in the Sivalik Hills.
The hills were named for Queen Morni, who is said to have ruled this city.
The work of creating the gardens began in the seventeenth century. Pinjore Gardens is the venue for an annual mango festival. The garden houses a mini zoo, historic places, a Japanese garden, a nursery and a number of picnic spots. According to Hindu theology, the Pandava brothers rested in Pinjore during their exile.
National Cactus and Succulent Botanical Garden and Research Centre a  cactus garden in the center of Panchkula, was established in 1987 and is known for its rare and endangered species of Indian succulent plants.
Kaushalya Dam is an earth-filled barrage dam on the Kaushalya river in Pinjore. It is an important wetland that is home to many endangered migratory birds.
Bir Shikargah Wildlife Sanctuary, Khol Hi-Raitan Wildlife Sanctuary, Pheasant Breeding Centre, Morni, Jatayu Conservation Breeding Centre, Pinjore, Pheasant Breeding Centre, Berwala.

Sports 
Panchkula has its own Sports Complex in Sector 3 includes Tau Devi Lal Cricket Stadium, Panchkula Golf Course, Olympic Athletic Track and other multi-purpose facilities for sports.

Tau Devi Lal Cricket Stadium has a cricket stadium, badminton hall, football ground, athletic Track and accommodation facilities for the sportsperson. It also boasts of a state of art modern international standard Astroturf laid Hockey Stadium with lights for eager hockey enthusiasts.

Panchkula Golf Course was set up in 2003 over a 135-acres of land. This 18-hole golf course is located in sector 3 in the foothills of Shivalik Hills on the banks of the Ghaggar River, just off the Himalayan Expressway.

Education

Colleges 
Government College, Sector 1
Government College for Girls, Sector 14
Mother Teresa Saket College of Physiotherapy, Chandimandir Cantonment
National Institute of Fashion Technology, Sector 23

CBSE affiliated school 
 Litera Heritage School, Sector-14, Ext.-2, Panchkula
 Army Public School, Chandimandir Cantonment
 Bhavan Vidyalaya, Sector 15
 Blue Bird, Sector 16
 CL DAV, Sector 11
 DAV Public School, Sector 8
 DC Model Senior Secondary School, Sector 7
 Doon Public School, Sector 21
 Hallmark Public School, Sector 15
 Hansraj Public School, Sector 6
 Haryana Model School, Sector 10
 Jainendra Public School, Sector 1
 Kendriya Vidyalaya No. 1 (KV1), Chandimandir Cantonment 
 Kendriya Vidyalaya No. 2 (KV2), Chandimandir Cantonment 
 Manav Mangal School, Sector 11
 New India Smart School, Sector 15
 St. Soldier Divine Public School, Sector 16
 Satluj Public School, Sector 4
 Shishu Niketan, MDC, Sector 5
 The British School Panchkula, Sector 8
 The Gurukul, Sector 20
 The Sky World School, Sector 21

CISCE affiliated schools 
 Little Flower Convent School, Sector 14
 St. Xavier's High School, Sector 20
 Saupin's School, Sector 9

Healthcare

Government run hospitals 
 Command Hospital, Chandimandir Cantonment
 General Hospital, Sector 6
 Government Pet Animal Medical Center Cum Teaching Hospital, Sector 3
 Government dispensaries in some sectors
 Saket Orthopedic Hospital, Sector 1.

Private hospitals 
 Alchemist Hospital, Sector 21
 Alchemist Eye Institute, Sector 21
 Blessings Hospital, Sector 15
 Chakravarty Nursing Home, Sector 10
 Clove Dental, Sector 20
 Dhawan Hospital, Sector 7
 Drishti Eye Hospital, Sector 10
 Gokul Surgical Hospital, Sector 15
 Happy Family Hospital, Sector 5 MDC
 Institute of Reproduction & Child Cares, Sector 17
 Ivy Hospital, Sector 5C MDC
 Jindal Nursing Home, Sector 17
 Kare Partners Mother And Child Hospital, Sector 2
 Malhotra Super Specialty Hospital, Sector 25
 Mind Peace Clinic Sector 14
 Mirchia Hospital Sector 15
 Noheria Nursing Home, Sector 8
 Ojas Hospital, Sector 26
 Orthomax Hospital, Sector 15
 Paras Hospital, HSIIDC Park, Sector 22
 Paras Bliss Hospital Sector 5 MDC
 Phoenix Hospital, Sector 16
 Raffles Hospital Sector 14
 Sunny Hospital, Sector 4
 Wings Hospital, Sector 25

Notable people from Panchkula

Ved Prakash Malik - Four star general who commanded the Indian Army during the Kargil War
Ayushmann Khurrana - Indian actor, singer, and television host
Aparshakti Khurana - Indian actor, radio jockey and a television host, brother of Ayushman Khurana
Sargun Mehta - Indian actress
Badshah (rapper) - Bollywood star
Manan Vohra - Cricketer
Yuvraj Singh - Cricketer
Sunil Jakhar - Politician
Rekha Sharma - Politician, chairperson of the National Commission for Women(NCW)
 Dolly Guleria - Famous Punjabi folk and Sufi singer, daughter of Nightingale of Punjab Padma Shri awardee Surinder Kaur
Sunaini Sharma - Ethnomusicologist and Cultural Conservationist, daughter of Dolly Guleria

See also
 Ajitgarh
 Amar Ujala
 Chandigarh
 Zirakpur

References

External links

 
Cities and towns in Panchkula district
Planned cities in India